This is a list of Billboards Top Hot 100 songs of 1997.

The list is also notable for featuring 14 songs that appeared in 1996's list, repeat onto to this list. With the highest being Toni Braxton's "Un-Break My Heart", which barely made it on to 1996's list at number 81 only accounting six weeks of its run in the 1996 chart year, and repeat higher at number 4 in 1997's. Only four more year-end list would repeat the same feat, that being 2010, 2016, 2018 and 2022.

See also
1997 in music
List of Billboard Hot 100 number-one singles of 1997
List of Billboard Hot 100 top-ten singles in 1997

References

1997 record charts
Billboard charts